Karl Fritsch (24 February 1864 – 17 January 1934) was an Austrian botanist.  He was born in Vienna and educated mainly at the University of Vienna, obtaining his PhD degree in 1886 and his Habilitation in 1890.  In 1900 he moved to the University of Graz as professor of Systematic Botany, where he built up the botanical institute.  In 1910 he was appointed as director of the university's botanical garden, and in 1916 the new institute acquired its own building.  He continued at Graz for the rest of his career, and died there.

Fritsch's extensive research focussed especially on the flora of Austria.  He had a particular interest in the family Gesneriaceae and in the taxonomy of the monocots.

References

External links
Portrait of Fritsch on the web pages of the University of Graz

1864 births
1934 deaths
19th-century Austrian botanists
Botanists with author abbreviations
Scientists from Vienna
University of Vienna alumni
Academic staff of the University of Graz
20th-century Austrian botanists